Han Seung-Yeop (born 4 November 1990) is a South Korean footballer who plays as a striker for K League Challenge Daejeon Citizen.

Club career

Daegu FC
He was selected by Daegu FC in 2013 K League Draft.

Becamex Bình Dương
Seung-yeop signed with V.League 1 side Becamex Bình Dương in December 2015.

References

External links 

1990 births
Living people
Association football forwards
South Korean footballers
Daegu FC players
K League 1 players
K League 2 players
Becamex Binh Duong FC players
V.League 1 players
Expatriate footballers in Vietnam
South Korean expatriate sportspeople in Vietnam
Daejeon Hana Citizen FC players